Mildred Paxton Moody (April 20, 1897 – March 1, 1983) was the wife of Texas Governor Dan Moody. Upon her recommendation the Forty-second Texas Legislature established the Board of Mansion Supervisors in 1931, with Mrs. Moody as the first head of the Board. Until its abolishment in 1965, the Board oversaw all interior and exterior upkeep and enhancements to the Texas Governor's Mansion.

Early life
She was born Mildred Paxton in Abilene, Texas on April 20, 1897, to banker George Paxton and his wife Mathilde Warren Paxton. With a B.A. from Hardin-Simmons and an M.A. from the University of Texas, she was the women's editor for the Abilene Reporter-News  while also teaching at Hardin-Simmons. Moody also received a degree from Columbia University. During her enrollment at the University of Texas, Moody had been one of the editors at The Daily Texan student newspaper.

First Lady of Texas
Her marriage to Texas politician Dan Moody was on April 20, 1926,  on her 29th birthday. Months later on election night, her new husband defeated the sitting Governor Miriam Ferguson. The 73-year-old Governor's Mansion was in a state of neglect and disrepair when the Moodys moved in. Mrs. Moody appealed to the state Board of Control, and was granted monies to renovate the State Dining Room. For additional renovations and structural improvements, she received funding from her father. The lengthy process of bringing the mansion up to livable modern standards left her determined to convince the State of Texas to provide regular funding for the mansion's future. After her husband's term expired in 1931, she authored a perspective of her tenure as the First Lady of Texas for The Dallas Morning News, including her recommendation that an entity needed to be created to oversee the mansion's upkeep. When the Forty-second Texas Legislature created the Board of Mansion Supervisors shortly after her recommendation, Governor Ross Sterling appointed her to head the board.

Final years
Governor and Mrs. Moody spent their remaining years in Austin. The couple had two children, Daniel Jr. and Nancy. Dan Moody died in 1966 and was buried at the Texas State Cemetery. Mildred outlived him by 17 years, dying in 1983. She is buried next to him.

Notes

References

1897 births
1983 deaths
20th-century American politicians
20th-century American women politicians
Burials at Texas State Cemetery
First Ladies and Gentlemen of Texas
History of women in Texas
People from Abilene, Texas
University of Texas at Austin alumni